Airforce (空军) is a Singapore Chinese miniseries produced by the SBC in 1988. It was produced in collaboration with the Ministry of Defence (Mindef) and features the Republic of Singapore Air Force and its aircraft such as the Northrop F-5, Aermacchi S-211 and Aermacchi SF.260. Most scenes were filmed on-site at Changi Airport and its adjoining air base. The series creator was Jiang Long, who also co-created the 1984 classic period drama The Awakening.

It was one of several SBC drama series re-aired on Channel 8 in 2007 as part of Mediacorp's anniversary celebrating 25 years of local Chinese drama production.

Cast
Li Nanxing 李南星 as Li Zhengting 李政庭
Chen Tianwen 陈天文 as Wu Hongfa 吴鸿发
Li Wenhai 李文海 as Lu Wenbiao 陆文彪
Huang Wenyong 黄文永 as Commander Kuang Guozhong 邝国忠
Zhu Houren 朱厚任 as Commander Zhu 朱司令
Richard Low 刘谦益 as Capt Liu 刘上尉
Wang Yuqing 王玉清 as Liu Shaohui 刘绍辉
Chen Liping 陈莉萍 as Lian Xueyin 连雪音
Lin Meijiao 林梅娇 as Mali 玛丽
Zheng Wanling 郑宛玲 as Shanshan 珊珊
Yang Libing 杨莉冰 as Meiqi 美琪
Wu Weiqiang 邬伟强 as Lian Ziheng 连子恒
Xiang Yun 向云 as Fang Zijun 方紫筠
Hong Guorui 洪国锐 as Capt Xu Shengwu 徐胜武
Zheng Geping 郑各评 as Zhao Feiying 赵飞鹰
Edmund Chen 陈之财 as Thomas Gan 甘奇峰
Liang Tian 梁田 as Zhao's father 赵父
Steven Woon 云昌凑 as Zhao's father colleague 赵父同僚
Bryan Chan 陈国华 as Zhao's father colleague 赵父同僚
Ye Shipin 叶世品 as flying instructor 飞行教官
Li Yinzhu 李茵珠 as Qian Meiyi 钱美仪
Chen Xiuhuan 陈秀环 as Chris

Synopsis
The series revolves around several young RSAF trainee pilots who aspire to become full-fledged pilots. As they are put through the rigorous training, they learn valuable lessons about friendship, teamwork and perseverance.

See also
Republic of Singapore Air Force

External links
Theme Song on YouTube
Airforce on meWatch

Singapore Chinese dramas